Bennet were a British alternative rock band formed in 1993.  They released two albums on Roadrunner Records, achieving mild success on the independent circuit in the UK.  They were best known for their 1997 single "Mum's Gone to Iceland", the title of which came from a British television advertisement for the supermarket chain, Iceland. The band split up in 1998.

In 2016 they reformed with a new single due to be released in the summer, as well as a B Sides compilation.

Discography

Albums
Super Natural (1996)
Street vs Science (1997)

Singles and EPs
"Curly Shirly" (1995)
"If You Met Me, Then You'd Like Me" (1996)
"Colossal Man" (1996)
"Someone Always Gets There First" (1996) - UK #69
"Mum's Gone to Iceland" (1997) - UK #34
"I Like Rock" (1997) - UK #79
"Horse's Mouth" (1998)

References

External links
[ Bennet overview at AllMusic Guide]
Discography

English rock music groups
Musical groups established in 1993
Musical groups disestablished in 1998
Musical groups from Reading, Berkshire
1993 establishments in England